Gyrothyris is a genus of brachiopods belonging to the family Terebratellidae.

The species of this genus are found in New Zealand.

Species:

Gyrothyris mawsoni 
Gyrothyris williamsi

References

Brachiopod genera